Topterone (developmental code name WIN-17665), also known as 17α-propyltestosterone (or simply propyltestosterone) or as 17α-propylandrost-4-en-17β-ol-3-one, is a steroidal antiandrogen that was first reported in 1978 and was developed for topical administration but, due to poor effectiveness, was never marketed.

See also
 Steroidal antiandrogen
 List of steroidal antiandrogens

References

Abandoned drugs
Androstanes
Anti-acne preparations
Steroidal antiandrogens